A ,  or, more colloquially, is a professional sumo wrestler.  follow and live by the centuries-old rules of the sumo profession, with most coming from Japan, the only country where sumo is practiced professionally. Participation in official tournaments is the only means of marking achievement in sumo, with the rank of an individual  based solely on official wins. The number of active  peaked at 943 in May 1994, at the height of the "Waka-Taka boom," but had declined to 665 by January 2022.

Terminology 

The two kanji characters that make up the word  are "strength/power" and "gentleman/samurai"; consequently, and more idiomatically, the term can be defined as "a gentleman of strength".

Lifestyle of  

The life of a professional sumo wrestler is strictly regimented and has detailed prescriptions and rules for  that have been observed for centuries, so much so that  can be seen more as a way of life than a career.

Sumo life centers around the training stables, to which all active wrestlers must belong. Most wrestlers, and all junior ones, live in their stable in a dormitory style: training, cleaning, eating, sleeping and socializing together.

Foreign-born  

Professional sumo is practiced exclusively in Japan, but wrestlers of other nationalities participate.  there were 55 wrestlers officially listed as foreigners. In July 2007, there were 19 foreigners in the top two divisions, which was an all-time record, and for the first time a majority of wrestlers in the top  ranks were from overseas. More recently, the ratio of foreigners has stabilized and  there were 18 foreigners in the two top divisions.

A Japanese-American, Toyonishiki, and the Korean-born Rikidōzan achieved  status prior to World War II, but neither were officially listed as foreigners. The first non-Asian to achieve fame and fortune in sumo was Hawaii-born Takamiyama. He reached the top division in 1968 and in 1972 became the first foreigner to win the top division championship. Musashimaru, born in Samoa and raised in Hawaii, became the second foreigner to reach sumo's top rank in 1999. Between 2003 and 2014, all four wrestlers reaching the  rank were Mongolian: Asashōryū, Hakuhō, Harumafuji and Kakuryū. In 2012, the Mongolian Kyokutenhō became the oldest wrestler in modern history to win a top division championship. Wrestlers from Eastern European countries such as Georgia and Russia have also found success in the upper levels of sumo. In 2005, Kotoōshū from Bulgaria became the first wrestler of European birth to attain the  ranking and the first to win a top division championship. In another milestone, Brazilian Ryūkō Gō became the first foreign born wrestler to be given  status.

Until relatively recently, the Japan Sumo Association had no restrictions at all on the number of foreigners allowed in professional sumo. In May 1992, shortly after the Ōshima stable had recruited six Mongolians at the same time, the Sumo Association's new director Dewanoumi, the former  Sadanoyama, announced that he was considering limiting the number of overseas recruits per stable and in sumo overall. There was no official ruling, but no stable recruited any foreigners for the next six years. This unofficial ban was then relaxed, but only two new foreigners per stable were allowed, until the total number reached 40. Then in 2002, a one foreigner per stable policy was officially adopted, though the ban was not retroactive, so foreigners recruited before the changes were unaffected. The move has been met with criticism. John Gunning claims it was introduced not for any racial reasons, but to ensure that foreign  assimilate into sumo culture. He explained, there would be ten Hawaiian wrestlers in the same stable living in their own "little clique," not learning Japanese, so the rule "protects the culture of stables."

Originally, it was possible for a place in a stable to open up if a foreign born wrestler acquired Japanese citizenship. This occurred when Hisanoumi changed his nationality from Tongan at the end of 2006, allowing another Tongan to enter his stable, and Kyokutenhō's change of citizenship allowed Ōshima stable to recruit Mongolian Kyokushūhō in May 2007. However, on February 23, 2010 the Sumo Association announced that it had changed its definition of "foreign" to "foreign-born", meaning that even naturalized Japanese citizens will be considered foreigners if they were born outside of Japan. The restriction on one foreign wrestler per stable was also reconfirmed. As Japanese law does not recognize subcategories of Japanese citizen, this unique treatment of naturalized citizens may well be illegal under Japanese law, although the restriction has never been challenged in court.

in contrast to other martial arts practitioners 
While sumo is considered a martial art, it diverges significantly from many other typical Eastern martial art styles, in both presentation and structure. Whereas most martial arts award promotions to practitioners through time and practice, a 's sumo rank can be gained and lost every two months in the official tournaments. Conversely, in more common Japanese martial arts (such as karate), ranks are gained after passing a single test, and practitioners of karate are not normally demoted, even after repeated poor performances at tournaments. All the benefits that  wrestlers receive can be taken from them if they fail to maintain a high level of achievement in each official tournament (or ).

Furthermore, sumo does not provide any means of achievement besides the official tournaments. A 's rank is determined solely by his number of wins during an official tournament. On the other hand, in many other Eastern martial arts, competitors can display their skill by performing standard routines, called  or forms, to receive recognition. Thus, sumo wrestlers are very specialized fighters who train to win their bouts using good technique, as this is their only means of gaining better privileges in their stables and higher salaries.

Former  in mixed martial arts 

The numerous differences between sumo and its martial arts counterparts have not deterred many former sumo wrestlers from competing in mixed martial arts. Most have had limited achievement; perhaps the most successful sumo wrestler to have competed in MMA is Tadao Yasuda, who holds a record of two wins and four losses. Sumo wrestlers are seen as generally ineffective in MMA because the sports are vastly different from one another in achieving victory; striking techniques and submissions are required for MMA and neither are taught in sumo wrestling. A few key sumo techniques which require grabbing the belt or pants of the opponent also become ineffective, as this is illegal in MMA.

Other sumo wrestlers to have fought in mixed martial arts include Baruto Kaito, Alan Karaev, Ōsunaarashi Kintarō, Kōji Kitao, Henry Armstrong Miller, Akebono Tarō, Teila Tuli and Wakashoyo. Former UFC Light Heavyweight Champion Lyoto Machida also has a sumo background but his main style is Shotokan Karate.

Gallery

See also 

Professional sumo divisions

References

External links 

 力士 - 相撲用語集 - 日本相撲協会公式サイト

Sumo terminology
Sport in Japan
Japanese words and phrases